Longe Demais das Capitais is the debut studio album by the Brazilian rock band Engenheiros do Hawaii, released in 1986.

Tracks

Personnel 
 
Humberto Gessinger: Vocals and Electric Guitar
Marcelo Pitz: Bass guitar and Vocals (Backing)
Carlos Maltz: Drums and Vocals (Backing), Creative consultant
Walter Lima: Recording Technician
Miguel Plopschi: Art Direction
Tadeu Valério:	Graphic Coordinator
Reinaldo B. Brito: Producer

References

1986 debut albums
Engenheiros do Hawaii albums